Pezzulli is am Italian surname. Notable people with the surname include:

Bepi Pezzulli (born 1970), Italian-British business lawyer, corporate executive, and essayist
Francesco Pezzulli (born 1973), Italian actor and voice actor

See also
Pezzullo

Italian-language surnames